Ethel Granger (born 12 April 1905 in Cambridgeshire as Ethel Mary Wilson; died January–March 1982 in Peterborough) was one of the most famous main figures in the development of contemporary piercing and body modification in Europe. As world record holder with the narrowest documented waist size, she entered the Guinness Book of Records  with a waist circumference of only 13 inches.

Life
As a young woman, Ethel met astronomer William Arnold Granger (b. 1 July 1904; † 4 March 1974), whom she married in 1928. The marriage produced a daughter, Wilhelmina Granger (1930-2001). Her husband required Ethel Granger to wear a corset so that she would have a narrow waist. She wore it day and night, eventually cinching her waist to a circumference of 33 centimeters.

Her husband's fetishism led him to start piercing Ethel himself. Thus, in the following years, she received several piercings from her husband in her nose, lips, cheeks and nipples.

Reviews
In September 2011, the Italian edition of the fashion magazine Vogue Ethel Granger an issue.

In 2019, the Association of Professional Piercers and the US Body Piercing Archive created the exhibition Mr. Sebastian and the European Piercing Underground to be presented at the Las Vegas Conference in 2020. The exhibit also highlights piercing pioneers Horst Streckenbach and Ethel Granger. Lecturers include Jeremy Castle of the Alan Oversby/Mr Sebastian Archive, Manfred Kohrs of the Institute of German Tattoo History, art historian -focusing on European body art- Matt Lodder of University of Essex, Paul King of the U.S. Body Piercing Archive, and Jim Ward.

Literature
 Guinness World Records 2015 Volume 60 Publisher Guinness World Records 2014, .
 Elayne Angel: Piercing Bible: The Definitive Guide to Safe Body Piercing. Crossing Press 2009, p. 13.
 Valerie Steele: Fetish: fashion, sex and power. Oxford University Press 1997, .
 Martin Mobberley: Return to the Far Side of Planet Moore: Rambling Through Observations, Friendships and Antics of Sir  Patrick Moore. Springer 2015, p. 60-62.
 Meredith G. F. Worthen: Sexual Deviance and Society: A sociological examination. Routledge 2016, p. 303.
 Rossie Atwell: The Grangers of Peterborough - an astronomical family. In: Journal of the British Astronomical Association, Vol. 100, No. 5, p. 214-217

References

1905 births
Body piercers
People known for their body modification
British women
Guinness World Records
1982 deaths